FabricLive.26 is a DJ mix album, mixed by The Herbaliser, recorded as part of the FabricLive albums and released on the Fabric label in February 2006.

Track listing
 Million Dan - "Dogz n Sledgez"
 J-Sands (of The Lone Catalysts) - "Southern Lady"
 2 tracks mixed
 RJD2 - "Ghostwriter"
 Dynamic Syncopation - "Ground Zero" (feat. Mass Influence)
 Blufoot - "Alphabet Man" (feat. Yungun)
 Hurby's Machine - "I Got an Attitude" (feat. Antoinette)
 Harry Love - "Surprize" (feat. Verb. T, Yungun & Mystro)
 2 tracks mixed
 The Herbaliser - "None Other" (feat. Cappo)
 DJ Format - "3 Feet Deep (Instrumental)" (feat. Abdominal & D-Sisive)
 James Brown - "Talkin' Loud and Sayin' Nothing"
 Lefties Soul Connection - "Welly Wanging"
 J Rocc - "Play this (One)"
 Eric B. & Rakim - "Paid in Full (Seven Minutes of Madness)" (Coldcut Remix)
 Demon Boyz - "Glimity Glamity"
 Cappo - "I.D.S.T."
 The Nextmen - "Spin it Round" (feat. Dynamite MC)
 The Jackson 5 - It's Great to be Here
 Breakestra - "Family Rap" (feat. Chali 2na, Soup, Double K, Wolf & Munyungo Jackson)
 Apathy - "It Takes a Seven Nation Army to Hold Us Back" (feat. Emilio Lopez)
 The Herbaliser - "Gadget Funk"
 Flying Fish - "Mr Matatwe" (Keep It Up)
 Hero No.7 - "Keeping it Real?"
 The Roots - "Boom!"
 Dynamix 2 - "Just Give the DJ a Break" (12 Club Version)
 Diplo - "Newsflash" (feat. Sandra Melody)
 Bugz in the Attic - "Booty La La"

Miscellanea
The Apathy track "It Takes a Seven Nation Army to Hold Us Back" is based on a sample of The White Stripes track, Seven Nation Army, and takes its title from that track combined with the Public Enemy album It Takes a Nation of Millions to Hold Us Back.

External links 
Fabric: FabricLive.26

Live
The Herbaliser albums
2006 compilation albums